HMS L33 was a British L-class submarine built by Swan Hunter, Wallsend, laid down in September 1917, launched in May 1919, and completed in December 1920. She was armed with six torpedo tubes, and had a top speed of  while surfaced. She had an uneventful career that included a deployment to the China Station in 1928. Obsolescent by the early 1930s, L33 was sold in February 1932 and broken up.

Description

She displaced  surfaced and  submerged. Her propulsion system consisted of two diesel engines for use while surfaced and two corresponding electric motors for use submerged. She could cruise at  while surfaced and  while submerged.

L33 was armed with a primary armament of four  torpedo tubes in the bow. These were supplied with eight torpedoes in total. Two additional,  tubes were located on the broadside, with a single torpedo apiece. She was also equipped with a  deck gun for use whilst surfaced. The gun was mounted on a revolving platform on the bridge level to increase its range and permit it to engage surfaced enemy submarines beyond torpedo range and in heavier seas. She had a crew of thirty-eight.

Service history
L33 was built at the Swan Hunter shipyard; she was laid down on 26 September 1917, and she was launched on 29 May 1919. Fitting-out was completed on 22 December 1919. After construction was completed, she underwent sea trials on the Tyne, which included both submerged and surface trials. On 16 March 1926, L33 collided with another unknown vessel, though there were no injuries in the incident.

By the 1930s, the L-class submarines had become obsolescent, and so most of them were removed from the Royal Navy's inventory. Accordingly, L33 was sold for scrapping in February 1932 and subsequently broken up.

Footnotes

References

Further reading
 

British L-class submarines
Ships built on the River Tyne
1919 ships
World War I submarines of the United Kingdom
Royal Navy ship names
Ships built by Swan Hunter